Salat, or salah, is the Islamic prayer.

Salat or salaat may also refer to:

 Salat, Iran, a village 
 Salat, Kulpahar, India, a village
 Salat (river), in France
 Salaat (caste), a Hindu caste in India
 Salaat (Muslim), Muslim converts from the Hindu Salaat caste
 Jana Salat (born 1979), a Canadian water polo player
 Salaat (film), 2010

See also

Salah (disambiguation)
Salad